Peter John Overton,  (born 5 April 1966) is an Australian television journalist and news presenter. He is currently the presenter for Nine News Sydney from Sunday to Thursday at 6 pm.

Early life and family
Born in England, Overton moved to Australia at age two after his parents returned home to the country. He grew up in Longueville, a suburb on the Lower North Shore of Sydney. He went to Lane Cove Public School and North Sydney Boys High School. He graduated with a Bachelor of Economics from Macquarie University. He also played the tuba whilst at Lane Cove Public School.

His father, Dr. John Overton, was an associate professor of anaesthesia at the University of Sydney and worked at The Children's Hospital at Westmead.

In the mid-1990s, Overton married his childhood sweetheart, but their marriage ended in divorce in 2000.

In mid 2001, Overton began dating then Ten Eyewitness News presenter Jessica Rowe. Overton and Rowe married in 2004 and have two daughters.

Career
Overton joined the Seven Network in Adelaide during the 1980s and 1990s as a sport reporter.

Overton joined the Nine Network soon after as a reporter for Nine News and later was appointed weekend sports presenter on Nine News in Sydney and fill-in presenter for Ken Sutcliffe. He also filed weekday news updates from the newsroom during Brian Henderson's tenure as presenter of Nine News in Sydney.

Overton occasionally presented weekend news bulletins, and substituted on National Nine Early News and Today news for Sharyn Ghidella and on Nightline for Jim Waley. He also co-hosted Nine's coverage of the Thredbo disaster with Tracy Grimshaw.

He was a reporter for the current affairs program 60 Minutes for eight years and also held positions at 2UE, Sky News Australia and the Seven Network in Adelaide.

In January 2009, Overton was appointed presenter of Nine News Sydney replacing Mark Ferguson following poor ratings. Ratings did not improve in his first week, with Nine dropping to fourth behind then-leader Seven, the ABC and Ten. However, after years of steady progress, Nine would later regain the ratings lead in the Sydney market. He also presents the Sunday edition of Nine's Late News; the weeknight edition is presented from Perth by Michael Thomson.

Overton had a cameo role as himself in the 2011 Australian horror film The Tunnel and in the sci-fi film Pacific Rim Uprising.

Community roles
Overton is a patron of the MonSTaR Foundation, a charity raising money and awareness of motor neurone disease. He is an ambassador for Special Olympics Australia, a not-for-profit organisation that supports children and adults with an intellectual disability.

Overton is also a Wing Commander in the Royal Australian Air Force as a specialist reserve public affairs officer.

References

External links

 
 Peter Overton bio – 60 Minutes @ ninemsn

1966 births
Living people
Nine News presenters
Australian television journalists
60 Minutes (Australian TV program) correspondents
Members of the Order of Australia
People educated at North Sydney Boys High School
Royal Australian Air Force officers